Thomas Barnewall may refer to:
 Thomas Barnewall, 13th Baron Trimlestown (died 1796), Irish noble
 Thomas Barnewall, 16th Baron Trimlestown (1796–1879), Irish landowner